The 2016 NBA draft was held on June 23, 2016, at Barclays Center in Brooklyn. It was televised nationally in the U.S. by ESPN, and was live streamed for the first time in NBA draft history by The Vertical. National Basketball Association (NBA) teams took turns selecting amateur U.S. college basketball players and other eligible players, including international players. The draft lottery took place during the playoffs, on May 17, 2016. This was the first time since the lottery system was introduced in 1985 that all NBA teams that missed out on the playoffs remained in the exact spots they were designated, meaning the 10-win/72-loss Philadelphia 76ers received the No. 1 pick, the Los Angeles Lakers kept the No. 2 pick, the Boston Celtics via the Brooklyn Nets got the No. 3 pick, and everyone else stayed in their same spots based on the regular season standings from the 2015–16 season.

Highlights from the draft include the second Australian No. 1 draft pick (Ben Simmons; the first being Andrew Bogut), the first Austrian to be selected into the NBA (Jakob Pöltl), the first high school prospect to be taken in the first round since the 2015 NBA draft (Thon Maker), the first Ghanaian to be selected into the NBA (Ben Bentil), the most Frenchmen to be taken overall (Guerschon Yabusele, Timothe Luwawu-Cabarrot, David Michineau, Isaia Cordinier, Petr Cornelie), the first time since the 1990 NBA draft that an Egyptian has been selected into the NBA (Abdel Nader), and the first time that two Chinese players have been selected into the same draft (Zhou Qi and Wang Zhelin) since the 2007 NBA draft. This draft was also notable for providing the most international draft prospects in draft history, with 28 different players representing different countries instead of the United States of America. It beat out the 2004 NBA draft for the most culturally diverse draft in league history. It was the second time that three players were selected from Serbian team Mega Leks in the same draft (Timothé Luwawu-Cabarrot, Ivica Zubac, Rade Zagorac), the first time being the 2014 NBA draft.

Draft selections

Notable undrafted players

These players were not selected in the 2016 NBA draft, but have appeared in at least one regular-season or playoff game in the NBA.

Eligibility and entrants

The draft is conducted under the eligibility rules established in the league's 2011 collective bargaining agreement (CBA) with its players union. The CBA that ended the 2011 lockout instituted no immediate changes to the draft, but called for a committee of owners and players to discuss future changes.
 All drafted players must be at least 19 years old during the calendar year of the draft. In terms of dates, players, who are eligible for the 2016 draft, must be born on or before December 31, 1997.
 On January 13, 2016, the NCAA Division I council approved a new rule for that division that significantly changed the draft landscape for college players:
 Declaration for the draft no longer results in automatic loss of college eligibility. As long as a player does not sign a contract with a professional team outside the NBA, or sign with an agent, he will retain college eligibility as long as he makes a timely withdrawal from the draft.
 NCAA players now have until 10 days after the end of the NBA Draft Combine to withdraw from the draft. For 2016, the withdrawal date was May 25, about five weeks after the previous mid-April deadline.
 NCAA players may participate in the draft combine, and will also be allowed to attend one tryout per year with each NBA team without losing college eligibility.
 NCAA players may now enter and withdraw from the draft multiple times without loss of eligibility. Previously, the NCAA treated a second declaration of draft eligibility as a permanent loss of college eligibility.
The NBA has since expanded the draft combine to include players with remaining college eligibility (who, like players without college eligibility, can only attend by invitation).

Early entrants
Player who are not automatically eligible must declare their eligibility for the draft by notifying the NBA offices in writing no later than 60 days before the draft. For the 2016 draft, this date fell on April 24. After this date "early entry" players may attend NBA pre-draft camps and individual team workouts to show off their skills and obtain feedback regarding their draft positions. Under the CBA a player may withdraw his name from consideration from the draft at any time before the final declaration date, which is 10 days before the draft. Under newly implemented NCAA rules, players had until May 25 (10 days after the draft combine) to withdraw from the draft and retain college eligibility.

A player who has hired an agent will forfeit his remaining college eligibility regardless of whether he is drafted. The CBA allows a player to withdraw from the draft twice; the 2016 NCAA rule change brought it in line with the CBA on this detail.

College underclassmen
A record-high 162 under-classed draft prospects had declared themselves for eligibility at the April 24 deadline (116 of them being from college), although college players who had not hired agents or signed professional contracts outside the NBA were able to decide to return to college by May 25, 10 days after the end of the NBA Draft Combine. At the end of the May 25 deadline, there were 57 players confirming their intentions of returning to school, thus leaving the grand total of underclassmen participating in the NBA draft as 59. Players listed in this region have publicly indicated that they have hired agents, planned to do so around this time, or made themselves their own agents; those who have hired agents and weren't drafted are deemed ineligible to return to NCAA basketball in 2016–17. However, with this year's draft class, it provided the most undrafted college underclassmen out there with 30 people there not being taken at all.

 Rosco Allen – F, Stanford (junior)
 Tony Anderson – F, Southeast Missouri State (freshman)
 Wade Baldwin IV – G, Vanderbilt (sophomore)
 Anthony "Cat" Barber – G, NC State (junior)
 Malik Beasley – G/F, Florida State (freshman)
 DeAndre' Bembry – G/F, Saint Joseph's (junior)
 Ben Bentil – F, Providence (sophomore)
 Jaylen Brown – F, California (freshman)
 Lamous Brown – C, USU Eastern (sophomore)
 Kareem Canty – G, Auburn (junior)
 Robert Carter Jr. – F, Maryland (junior)
 Marquese Chriss – F, Washington (freshman)
 Deyonta Davis – F, Michigan State (freshman)
 Cheick Diallo – F/C, Kansas (freshman)
 Kris Dunn – G, Providence (junior)
 Henry Ellenson – F, Marquette (freshman)
 Kay Felder – G, Oakland (junior)
 Brannen Greene – G/F, Kansas (junior)
 Daniel Hamilton – G/F, Connecticut (sophomore)
 Cedric Happi Noube – F, Virginia Union (junior)
 Jordan Hare – F, Rhode Island (junior)
 Brandon Ingram – F, Duke (freshman)
 Demetrius Jackson – G, Notre Dame (junior)
 Julian Jacobs – G, USC (junior)
/ Stefan Janković – F, Hawaii (junior)
 Anthony January – F, Cal State San Bernardino (junior)
 Damian Jones – F/C, Vanderbilt (junior)
 Derrick Jones Jr. – F, UNLV (freshman)
 Nikola Jovanović – C, USC (junior)
 Skal Labissière – F/C, Kentucky (freshman)
 Jermaine Lawrence – F, Manhattan (sophomore)
/ Thon Maker – F/C, Orangeville Prep/Athlete Institute (postgraduate)
/ Emmanuel Malou – F/C, Yuba College (sophomore)
 Patrick McCaw – G, UNLV (sophomore)
 Zak McLaughlin – F/C, Gadsden State CC (freshman)
 Dejounte Murray – G, Washington (freshman)
 Jamal Murray – G, Kentucky (freshman)
 Mamadou N'Diaye – C, UC Irvine (junior)
 Chris Obekpa – F, UNLV (junior)
 Goodluck Okonoboh – C, UNLV (sophomore)
 Chinanu Onuaku – F, Louisville (sophomore)
 Jakob Poeltl – C, Utah (sophomore)
 Tim Quarterman – G, LSU (junior)
 Jalen Reynolds – F, Xavier (junior)
 Malachi Richardson – G, Syracuse (freshman)
 Domantas Sabonis – F/C, Gonzaga (sophomore)
 Wayne Selden Jr. – G, Kansas (junior)
 Ingrid Sewa – F/C, Arizona Western College (sophomore)
 Pascal Siakam – F, New Mexico State (sophomore)
 Ben Simmons – F, LSU (freshman)
 Diamond Stone – C, Maryland (freshman)
 Isaiah Taylor – G, Texas (junior)
 Tyler Ulis – G, Kentucky (sophomore)
 Aaron Valdes – G, Hawaii (junior)
 James Webb III – F, Boise State (junior)
 Isaiah Whitehead – G, Seton Hall (sophomore)
 Devin Williams – F, West Virginia (junior)
 Troy Williams – F, Indiana (junior)
 Stephen Zimmerman – C, UNLV (freshman)

International players
International players that had declared this year and didn't previously declare in another prior year can also drop out of the draft about 10 days before the draft begins on June 13. Initially, there were 46 players that expressed interest in entering the 2016 draft. However, at the end of June 13, there were 33 international prospects that, for one reason or another, declined entry to the 2016 NBA draft, leaving only 13 international candidates for the event. That left the overall number of underclassmen entering the draft as 72.

 Gracin Bakumanya – C/F, Olympique Antibes (France)
 Dragan Bender – F/C, Maccabi Tel Aviv (Israel)
 Isaia Cordinier – G, ASC Denain-Voltaire (France)
 Petr Cornelie – F/C, Le Mans Sarthe (France)
 Juan Hernangómez – F, Movistar Estudiantes (Spain)
 Furkan Korkmaz – G, Anadolu Efes (Turkey)
 Timothé Luwawu-Cabarrot – G/F, Mega Leks (Serbia)
 Georgios Papagiannis – C, Panathinaikos (Greece)
 Guerschon Yabusele – F, Rouen Métropole (France)
 Rade Zagorac – G/F, Mega Leks (Serbia)
 Zhou Qi – C, Xinjiang Flying Tigers (China)
 Ante Žižić – C, KK Cibona (Croatia)
 Ivica Zubac – C, Mega Leks (Serbia)

Automatically eligible entrants

Players who do not meet the criteria for "international" players are automatically eligible if they meet any of the following criteria:
 They have completed four years of their college eligibility.
 If they graduated from high school in the U.S., but did not enroll in a U.S. college or university, four years have passed since their high school class graduated.
 They have signed a contract with a professional basketball team outside of the NBA, anywhere in the world, and have played under that contract.

Players who meet the criteria for "international" players are automatically eligible if they meet any of the following criteria:
 They are least 22 years old during the calendar year of the draft. In terms of dates, players born on or before December 31, 1994, are automatically eligible for the 2016 draft.
 They have signed a contract with a professional basketball team outside of the NBA within the United States, and have played under that contract.

Based on the eligibility rules, all college seniors who have completed their college eligibility and all "international" players who were born on or before December 31, 1994, are automatically eligible for the draft. However, there are other players who became automatically eligible even though they have not completed their four-year college eligibility.

Combine

The invitation-only NBA Draft Combine was held in Chicago from May 10 to 15. The on-court element of the combine took place on May 12 and 13. This year, a total of 63 players entered the combine, with the only two alternates that had their invitations be accepted for the event being Jaron Blossomgame and Marcus Lee. Furthermore, the only international player that got invited and accepted his invitation this year was Zhou Qi of the Xinjiang Flying Tigers. Originally, Wayne Selden Jr. was to be a participant for the event, but he injured himself before the combine officially began, thus making Sheldon McClellan from the Miami Hurricanes men's basketball team his replacement for on-court events. Buddy Hield, the consensus national college player of the year for 2015–16, participated only in off-court events; his graduation ceremony at the University of Oklahoma conflicted with the on-court portion of the combine, and he chose to attend graduation. A. J. Hammons also withdrew his name from the draft combine on the day of the on-court events.

During the event, sophomore Kentucky and future Phoenix Suns point guard Tyler Ulis broke combine records by being the lightest player recorded in draft combine history at 149.2 pounds. After the event, nine of the participants that were a part of the combine went back to their respective colleges. However, it was announced just days after the NBA Draft Combine was over that some of the events' measurements would be under review since some prospects were provided with rather questionable results, especially when compared to how they measured up in previous physical events.

Draft lottery

The NBA conducts an annual lottery to determine the draft order for the teams did not make the playoffs in the preceding season. Every NBA team that missed the NBA playoffs had a chance at winning a top three pick, but teams with worse records had a better chance at winning a top three pick. After the lottery selected the teams that receive a top three pick the other teams receive an NBA draft pick based on their winning percentage from the prior season.  As it is commonplace in the event of identical win–loss records, the NBA performed a random drawing to break the ties on April 15, 2016. The table below shows each non-playoff team's chances (based on their record at the end of the NBA season) of receiving picks 1–14.

The 2016 NBA lottery was held on May 17. The Philadelphia 76ers, who had the worst record in the NBA and the highest chance to win the lottery at 26.9% (given the 25% chance to win outright and 1.9% chance that the Sacramento Kings, with whom the 76ers had previously traded for pick-swap rights, would be drawn first), won the lottery. The Los Angeles Lakers stayed at the second spot, and the Brooklyn Nets (whose pick was acquired by the Boston Celtics via an earlier trade) stayed at the third spot. As a result, the only team that would have multiple selections in the lottery would be the Phoenix Suns, who hold their own fourth selection, which held the least likely odds of staying exactly where it was at out of all teams in the draft at 9.9%, and the thirteenth selection, which was acquired from the Washington Wizards earlier in the year and had a 97.8% chance of keeping Washington's selection (either at 96% with Pick 13 or at 1.8% at Pick 14). This was the first instance in NBA draft lottery history where every selection remained exactly where it was originally placed before the lottery began, which actually was held by 1.8% likelihood despite having a 1-in-55 chance of it happening due to the lottery selecting only the Top 3 slots.

Invited attendees
The NBA annually invites around 15–20 players to sit in the so-called "green room", a special room set aside at the draft site for the invited players plus their families and agents. When their names are called, the player leaves the room and goes up on stage. Other players who are not invited are allowed to attend the ceremony. They sit in the stands with the fans and walk up on stage when (or if) they are drafted. The following 19 players were invited (listed alphabetically) to the 2016 NBA draft on June 18, one day before the 2016 NBA Finals ended. A record-high 5 different players were added to the green room listing before the beginning of the 2016 NBA draft commenced.

 Wade Baldwin IV, Vanderbilt
 Malik Beasley, Florida State (not on the original list, added later)
 Dragan Bender, Maccabi Tel Aviv
 Jaylen Brown, California
 Marquese Chriss, Washington
 Deyonta Davis, Michigan State
 Kris Dunn, Providence
 Henry Ellenson, Marquette
 Buddy Hield, Oklahoma
 Brandon Ingram, Duke
 Skal Labissière, Kentucky
 Timothé Luwawu-Cabarrot, Mega Leks (not on the original list, added later)
 Dejounte Murray, Washington (not on the original list, added later)
 Jamal Murray, Kentucky
 Jakob Pöltl, Utah
 Malachi Richardson, Syracuse (not on the original list, added later)
 Domantas Sabonis, Gonzaga
 Ben Simmons, LSU
 Denzel Valentine, Michigan State (not on the original list, added later)

Trades involving draft picks

Pre-draft trades
Prior to the day of the draft, the following trades were made and resulted in exchanges of draft picks between the teams.

Draft-day trades
Draft-day trades occurred on June 23, 2016, the day of the draft.

See also
 List of first overall NBA draft picks

Notes

References

External links

Official Site

Draft
National Basketball Association draft
NBA draft
NBA draft
2010s in Brooklyn
Basketball in New York City
Sporting events in New York City
Sports in Brooklyn
Events in Brooklyn, New York